The 2021–22 Winthrop Eagles men's basketball team represented Winthrop University in the 2021–22 NCAA Division I men's basketball season. The Eagles, led by 1st-year head coach Mark Prosser, played their home games at the Winthrop Coliseum in Rock Hill, South Carolina as members of the Big South Conference.

Previous season
The Eagles finished the 2020–21 season 23–2, 17–1 in Big South play to finish as Big South regular season champions. They defeated Campbell in the finals. They earned the Big South's automatic bid into the NCAA tournament and were defeated by Villanova in the first round.

Roster

Schedule and results

|-
!colspan=12 style=|Non-conference regular season

|-
!colspan=9 style=| Big South Conference regular season
|-

|-
!colspan=12 style=| Big South tournament
|-

|-

Source

References

Winthrop Eagles men's basketball seasons
Winthrop Eagles
Winthrop Eagles men's basketball
Winthrop Eagles men's basketball